Philip Lonergan (1887–1940) was a screenwriter in the United States.

He was part of a family of prominent screenwriters. Lloyd Lonergan was his brother.

Filmography
The Phantom Witness
The Little Girl Next Door (1912)
The World and the Woman (1916), co-wrote with William C. deMille
King Lear (1916 film)
The Barrier of Flames  (1914)
Silas Marner (1916 film)
Her Beloved Enemy (1917)
The Candy Girl (1917)
War and the Woman (1917)
Her Life and His (1917)
The Fugitive (1916 film)
Woman, Saint and Devil
Mandarin's Gold (1919)
Almost Married (1919 film)
The Penalty (1920 film) with Charles KenyonThe Girl with the Jazz Heart (1921), co-wrote with George MooserThe Steadfast Heart (1923), adaptationWine (1924 film)Private Izzy Murphy'' (1926), adaptation

References

American screenwriters
1887 births
1940 deaths
People from Hackensack, New Jersey
People from Hollywood, Los Angeles